KaMubukwana is a bairro in Maputo, Mozambique.

References 

 

Populated places in Mozambique